Tianshui Maijishan Airport , or Tianshui Air Base, is a dual-use military and civil airport serving the city of Tianshui in Gansu Province, China.  It is located in Maiji District of Tianshui,  from the tourist destination of Maijishan after which it is named.

Originally a military airfield, it was converted in 2008 to a dual-use military and civil airport with an investment of 64 million yuan.  The airport was opened to commercial flights on September 28, 2008.

The airport, which is restricted between the two urban cores of the city, will be replaced by a new dual-use airport, to be located 20 km west, near Zhongliang Town. The new airport will measure 4 km2, and have a  runway. Construction of the new airport started on 26 September 2020.

Facilities

Airlines and destinations

Military use
The nearby AVIC Tianshui Aviation Industry company uses the airport to receive and deliver aircraft under maintenance.

Gallery

See also
List of airports in China
List of the busiest airports in China
List of People's Liberation Army Air Force airbases

References

External links

Airports in Gansu
Chinese Air Force bases
Airports established in 2008
2008 establishments in China